{{DISPLAYTITLE:C19H21NS}}
The molecular formula C19H21NS (molar mass: 295.44 g/mol, exact mass: 295.1395 u) may refer to:

 Dosulepin, also known as dothiepin
 McN5652
 Pizotifen, or pizotyline